The 325th Fighter-Interceptor Squadron is an inactive United States Air Force unit, last assigned to Air Defense Command at Truax Field, Wisconsin, where it was inactivated on 25 June 1966.

The squadron was first active as a training unit during World War II.

History

World War II
The squadron was activated as the 325th Fighter Squadron, one of the original squadrons of the 327th Fighter Group.  It performed air defense missions, but became an operational training unit until February 1944, and afterward served as a replacement training unit until being disbanded in April 1944.

Air Defense Command

The squadron was reconstituted as the 325th Fighter-Interceptor Squadron and activated at Travis Air Force Base in April 1953, where it was equipped with the radar equipped and Mighty Mouse rocket armed North American F-86D Sabres.  The following February, it moved to Hamilton Air Force Base. From both bases it operated to defend the Pacific Coast.

The squadron moved on paper to Truax Field, Wisconsin on 18 August 1955, where it assumed the mission, personnel and equipment of 456th Fighter-Interceptor Squadron, which moved in turn to Castle Air Force Base, California as part of Project Arrow, an Air Defense Command program which was designed to bring back on the active list the fighter units which had compiled memorable records in the two world wars. Two years later, it equipped with the Convair F-102 Delta Dagger. At Truax, it was responsible for the air defense of the upper Midwest until 1966.

On 22 October 1962, before President John F. Kennedy told Americans that missiles were in place in Cuba, the squadron dispersed a portion of its force to Des Moines Airport at the start of the Cuban Missile Crisis. At the beginning of the crisis, the 331st Fighter-Interceptor Squadron had deployed F-102s to Homestead Air Force Base, Florida.  The 325th was the only F-102 squadron whose planes had not been modified to carry the GAR-11 Falcon nuclear missile and its planes were armed with Mighty Mouse rockets, which provided a superior low altitude intercept capability. The 325th replaced the 331st at Homestead to take advantage of this capability.  Following the crisis, twenty of the squadron's F-102s were kept at Homestead until Air Defense Command (ADC) decided to replace the F-102s there with F-104s. Although the F-104 had been removed from the ADC inventory in 1960 because of its lack of an all-weather capability, this was not a factor at Homestead because Cuba lacked a bomber force and the F-104 had a superior fighter against fighter capability.  The alert responsibility at Homestead was assumed by F-104s of the 319th Fighter-Interceptor Squadron on 15 April 1963 and the 325th's planes returned to Truax.

Lineage
 Constituted as the 325th Fighter Squadron on 24 June 1942
 Activated on 25 August 1942
 Disbanded on 10 April 1944
 Reconstituted and redesignated 325th Fighter-Interceptor Squadron on 11 February 1953
 Activated on 20 April 1953
 Inactivated on 25 June 1966

Assignments
 327th Fighter Group, 25 August 1942 – 10 April 1944 (attached to the Philadelphia Fighter Wing, 15 September 1943 – 28 January 1944)
 28th Air Division, 20 April 1953
 566th Air Defense Group, 1 February 1954 – 18 August 1955
 327th Fighter Group, 18 August 1955 – 25 June 1966

Stations
 Mitchel Field, New York, 25 August 1942
 Richmond Army Air Base, Virginia, 25 August 1942
 Millville Army Air Field, New Jersey, 18 September 1943
 Richmond Army Air Base, Virginia, 8 January 1944
 Norfolk Army Air Field, Virginia, 16 February – 10 April 1944
 Travis Air Force Base, California, 20 April 1953
 Hamilton Air Force Base, California, 10 February 1954 – 18 August 1955
 Truax Field, Wisconsin, 18 August 1955 – 25 June 1966

Aircraft
 Curtiss P-40 Warhawk, 1942–1943
 Republic P-47 Thunderbolt, 1943–1944
 Lockheed T-33A-1-LO Shooting Star, 1954
 North American F-86D Sabre, 1953–1957
 Convair F-102 Delta Dagger, 1957–1966

See also

References

Notes

Bibliography

 Buss, Lydus H.(ed), Sturm, Thomas A., Volan, Denys, and McMullen, Richard F., History of Continental Air Defense Command and Air Defense Command July to December 1955, Directorate of Historical Services, Air Defense Command, Ent AFB, CO, (1956)
 
 
 
 McMullen, Richard F. (1964) "The Fighter Interceptor Force 1962–1964"  ADC Historical Study No. 27, Air Defense Command, Ent Air Force Base, CO (Confidential, declassified 22 March 2000)
 NORAD/CONAD Participation in the Cuban Missile Crisis, Historical Reference Paper No. 8, Directorate of Command History Continental Air Defense Command, Ent AFB, CO, 1 Feb 63 (Top Secret NOFORN, declassified 9 March 1996)
 "ADCOM's Fighter Interceptor Squadrons". The Interceptor (January 1979) Aerospace Defense Command, (Volume 21, Number 1)

325
Military units and formations in Wisconsin